All the Best contains the majority of Glen Campbell's recordings that reached the Top 40 of the Billboard Hot 100. It was his best charting album since Southern Nights (1977).

Track listing
 "Rhinestone Cowboy" — (Larry Weiss) - 3:15
 "Galveston" — (Jimmy Webb) - 2:42
 "Wichita Lineman" — (Jimmy Webb) - 3:07
 "By the Time I Get to Phoenix" — (Jimmy Webb) - 2:44
 "Gentle on My Mind" — (John Hartford) - 2:58
 "Southern Nights" — (Allen Toussaint) - 2:58
 "Country Boy (You Got Your Feet In LA)" — (Lambert, Brian Potter) - 3:09
 "Dreams of the Everyday Housewife" — (Chris Gantry) - 2:35
 "It's Only Make Believe" — (Conway Twitty, Jack Nance) - 2:27
 "I Wanna Live" — (John D. Loudermilk) - 2:44
 "Try a Little Kindness" — (Austin, Sapaugh) - 2:25
 "Sunflower" — (Neil Diamond) - 2:51
 "Dream Baby (How Long Must I Dream)" — (Cindy Walker) - 2:32
 "Honey, Come Back" — (Jimmy Webb) - 3:01
 "Let It Be Me" — (with Bobbie Gentry) (Gilbert Bécaud, Pierre Delanoë, Mann Curtis) - 2:05
 "True Grit" — (Bernstein, Black) - 2:32
 "Houston (I'm Comin' To See You)" — (David Paich) - 3:20
 "Don't Pull Your Love/Then You Can Tell Me Goodbye" — (Lambert, Brian Potter, John D. Loudermilk) - 3:22
 "Highwayman" — (Jimmy Webb]) - 3:04
 "I'm Gonna Love You" — (Michael Smotherman) - 3:26
 "Where's The Playground Suzie" — (Jimmy Webb) - 2:56
 "All I Have to Do Is Dream" — (with Bobbie Gentry) (Boudleaux Bryant) - 2:36
 "Hey Little One" — (Dorsey Burnette, Barry DeVorzon) - 2:33
 "The Last Time I Saw Her" — (Gordon Lightfoot) - 4:06
 "Everything a Man Could Ever Need" — (Mac Davis) - 2:32

Production
Executive producer - Mark Copeland
Compiled by Kevin Flaherty
Liner notes - Valerie V. Hansen
Art direction - Michelle Azzopardi
Photography - Jeff Ross
Mastered by Bob Norberg/Capitol Mastering, Hollywood, CA

Charts
Album - Billboard (United States)

References

2003 greatest hits albums
Glen Campbell compilation albums
Capitol Records compilation albums